Salvatore "Robert" Loggia (January 3, 1930 – December 4, 2015) was an American actor. He was nominated for the Academy Award for Best Supporting Actor for Jagged Edge (1985) and won the Saturn Award for Best Supporting Actor for Big (1988).

In a career spanning over sixty years, Loggia performed in many films, including The Greatest Story Ever Told (1965), three Pink Panther films, An Officer and a Gentleman (1982), Scarface (1983), Prizzi's Honor (1985), Oliver & Company (1988), Innocent Blood (1992), Independence Day (1996), Lost Highway (1997), Return to Me (2000), and Tim and Eric's Billion Dollar Movie (2012). He also appeared on television series including 
the Walt Disney limited series, The Nine Lives of Elfego Baca (starring role-1958), Mancuso, FBI (in which he starred-1989–1990), Malcolm in the Middle (2001), The Sopranos (2004), Men of a Certain Age (2011), and was also the star of the 1966–67 NBC martial arts / action series, T.H.E. Cat.

Early life and education
Loggia was born in Staten Island, New York, on January 3, 1930, to Biagio Loggia, a shoemaker born in Palma di Montechiaro, Province of Agrigento, Sicily, and Elena Blandino, a homemaker born in Vittoria, Province of Ragusa, Sicily. He grew up in the Little Italy neighborhood, where the family spoke Italian at home. He graduated from New Dorp High School before taking courses at Wagner College where he joined the Alpha Sigma Phi fraternity. In 1951, he earned a degree in journalism from University of Missouri. He later studied acting with Alvina Krause at Northwestern University.

After serving in the United States Army during the Korean War, he married Marjorie Sloan in 1954 and began a long career at the Actors Studio, studying under Stella Adler.

Career
At age 25, he made his debut on Broadway in The Man with the Golden Arm in 1955.

Although Loggia made his first film, Somebody Up There Likes Me (1956), in an uncredited appearance, it was not until he was cast as a New Mexico lawman Elfego Baca, two years later, that he made a breakthrough in Hollywood. Loggia was a radio and TV anchor on the Southern Command Network in the Panama Canal Zone, and he came to prominence playing a real-life sheriff in The Nine Lives of Elfego Baca, a series of Walt Disney TV shows. He later starred as the proverbial cat-burglar-turned-good circus artist Thomas Hewitt Edward Cat in a short-lived detective series called T.H.E. Cat, first broadcast in 1966. At first, T.H.E. Cat appeared to be a success, Loggia said: "We're drawing about a 30 per cent share of the audience, which NBC considers fine for a new show with a new star." After NBC cancelled the series when viewing figures failed to deliver, Loggia went into a mid-life crisis—a "Dante-esque descent into the inferno", as he called it later. For six years his career foundered, and his marriage fell apart. Restless and unnerved, constantly riddled with self-doubt, a chance meeting with Audrey O'Brien was his saving grace. She helped him out of the crisis, and they later married. Despite playing Frank Carver on the CBS soap opera The Secret Storm in 1972, he took a new course when he decided to begin a career in directing.

He also carried on acting and amassed many television credits in a variety of roles, including appearances on Overland Trail, Target: The Corruptors!, The Untouchables, The Eleventh Hour, Breaking Point, Combat!, Custer, Columbo, Ellery Queen, The High Chaparral, Gunsmoke, Voyage to the Bottom of the Sea, The Big Valley, The Wild Wild West, Rawhide, Little House on the Prairie, The Rockford Files, Starsky & Hutch, Charlie's Angels, Magnum, P.I., Quincy, M.E., Kojak, Hawaii Five-0, The Six Million Dollar Man, The Bionic Woman, Falcon Crest, Frasier, The Sopranos, Monk, and Oliver Stone's miniseries Wild Palms.

The director Blake Edwards often cast Loggia in his films in minor or supporting roles. These included Revenge of the Pink Panther (1978) and other Pink Panther sequels, and S.O.B. (1981), which was a satire about Hollywood.

In 1983, Loggia played Frank Lopez, a drug dealer who was one of the main supporting characters and antagonists in the film Scarface, which is often considered a Hollywood classic film.

Loggia also acted in several widely acclaimed films such as An Officer and a Gentleman (1982), Prizzi's Honor (1985), and Independence Day (1996). Other films starring Loggia include Over The Top (1987), Necessary Roughness (1991), and Return to Me (2000).

Loggia was nominated for the Academy Award for Best Supporting Actor for his portrayal of crusty private detective Sam Ransom in the crime thriller Jagged Edge (1985). He was nominated for the Primetime Emmy Award for Outstanding Lead Actor in a Drama Series, his first such honor, for portraying FBI agent Nick Mancuso in the TV series Mancuso, FBI (1989–1990), a follow-up to the previous year's miniseries Favorite Son (1988). Loggia appeared as a mobster in multiple films, including Bill Sykes, the immoral loanshark and shipyard agent in Disney's animated film Oliver & Company (1988), Salvatore "The Shark" Macelli in John Landis' Innocent Blood (1992), Mr. Eddy in David Lynch's Lost Highway (1997), and Don Vito Leoni in David Jablin's The Don's Analyst (1997). Additionally, he played violent mobster Feech La Manna in several episodes of The Sopranos. 
 
In 1998, Loggia appeared in a television commercial lampooning obscure celebrity endorsements. In it, a young boy names Loggia as someone he would trust to recommend Minute Maid orange-tangerine blend. Loggia instantly appears and endorses the drink, to which the boy exclaims, "Whoa, Robert Loggia!" The commercial was later referenced in a Malcolm in the Middle episode in which Loggia made a guest appearance as "Grandpa Victor" (for which he received his second Emmy nomination); in it, Loggia drinks some orange juice, then spits it out and complains about the presence of pulp.

In addition to voicing Sykes in Disney's Oliver & Company, Loggia had several other voice acting roles, in multiple media, including: Admiral Petrarch in the computer game FreeSpace 2 (1999) and the anime movie The Dog of Flanders (1997), crooked cop Ray Machowski in the video game Grand Theft Auto III (2001), and a recurring role on the Adult Swim animated TV comedy series Tom Goes to the Mayor (2004–2006).

In August 2009, Loggia appeared in one of Apple's Get a Mac advertisements. The advertisement features Loggia as a personal trainer hired by PC to get him back on top of his game. On October 26, 2009, TVGuide.com announced Loggia had joined the cast of the TNT series Men of a Certain Age.

Loggia also appeared in two episodes of the animated series Family Guy as himself; in the episode "Brothers and Sisters", after Mayor West tells his fiancé Carol he has "aides" (which Carol mistakes for AIDS), before he clarifies that he is referring to his assistants; West then remarks that they both have AIDS, and the scene cuts to Loggia, angrily responding "NOT OKAY!". In the episode "Call Girl", he is seen twice denoting the passage of time in boring events. The script would cut away to Loggia saying "Eight f***ing hours later", then back to the story, further along in the plot. In 2012, Loggia portrayed Saint Peter during his final imprisonment in The Apostle Peter and the Last Supper. Loggia partnered with Canadian entrepreneur Frank D'Angelo from 2013, appearing in three films (Real Gangsters, The Big Fat Stone, and No Depo$it), with a fourth film in production (Sicilian Vampire) at the time of Loggia's death.

Loggia served as a director for episodes of Quincy M.E., Magnum, P.I., and Hart to Hart.

Loggia reprised his role from Independence Day, General William Grey, in a cameo appearance alongside his wife, Audrey, in the 2016 sequel Independence Day: Resurgence, filmed shortly before his death. The film was released posthumously and dedicated to him.

Personal life

Loggia was married to Marjorie Sloan from 1954 to 1981, with whom he had three children. Loggia and Sloan were divorced in 1981. In 1982, Loggia married Audrey O'Brien, a business executive and the mother of his stepdaughter Cynthia Marlette. Loggia and O'Brien remained married until his death in 2015.

Illness and death 
In 2010, Loggia was diagnosed with Alzheimer's disease. He died on December 4, 2015, due to complications from the disease, at his home in the Brentwood neighborhood of Los Angeles, at the age of 85. He is interred at the Westwood Memorial Park.

Honors and recognitions
In 2010, Loggia was awarded the Ellis Island Medal of Honor in recognition of his humanitarian efforts.

On December 17, 2011, Loggia was honored by his alma mater, the University of Missouri, with an honorary degree for his career and his humanitarian efforts.

Filmography

Film

Television

Video games

Awards and nominations

References

External links 

 
 
 
 Robert Loggia at the University of Wisconsin's Actors Studio audio collection
Robert Loggia (Aveleyman)

1930 births
2015 deaths
20th-century American male actors
21st-century American male actors
American male film actors
American male stage actors
American male television actors
American male video game actors
American male voice actors
American people of Italian descent
American television directors
Deaths from dementia in California
Deaths from Alzheimer's disease
Male actors from New York City
People from Staten Island
United States Army soldiers
University of Missouri alumni
Method actors
New Dorp High School alumni
People of Sicilian descent